Donkey Kong 64 is a 1999 platform game developed by Rare and published by Nintendo for the Nintendo 64. It is the first 3D game in the Donkey Kong series. As the gorilla Donkey Kong, the player explores themed levels to collect items and rescue his kidnapped friends from King K. Rool. The player completes minigames and puzzles as five playable Kong characters—each with their own special abilities—to receive bananas and other collectibles. In a separate multiplayer mode, up to four players can compete in deathmatch and last man standing games.

After developing the Donkey Kong Country trilogy for Super Nintendo (1994–1996), Rare began working on Donkey Kong 64 in 1997, although production restarted halfway through the three-year development cycle. A 16-person team, with many recruits from Rare's Banjo group, finished it in 1999. It was published by Nintendo in North America in November and worldwide in December. It was the first game to require the Nintendo 64 Expansion Pak, an accessory that added memory resources. The  marketing campaign included advertisements, sweepstakes, and a national tour.

Donkey Kong 64 received universal acclaim and was Nintendo's top seller during the 1999 holiday season, with 2.3 million units sold by 2004. It won the 1999 E3 Game Critics award for Best Platform Game, and multiple awards and nominations from magazines. Reviewers praised the exceptional size and length, but criticized its camera controls and emphasis on item collection and backtracking. Some cited its similarity in gameplay and visuals to Rare's 1998 predecessor, Banjo-Kazooie (1998). Critics said it did not match the revolutionary impact of Donkey Kong Country, but was still among the Nintendo 64's best 3D platform games.

Donkey Kong 64 was Rare's final Donkey Kong game prior to its acquisition by Microsoft in 2002. Retrospective reviews of Donkey Kong 64 were mixed; critics considered it emblematic of the tedium in Rare's "collect-a-thon" adventure platformers. Donkey Kong 64 was rereleased on Nintendo's Wii U Virtual Console in 2015.

Gameplay 

Donkey Kong 64 is a 3D platforming adventure game in which the player, as Donkey Kong and his friends, explores an island and collects items to progress through minigames and puzzles. The game follows a traditional storyline for the series: King K. Rool and his reptilian Kremlings invade the idyllic DK Isle and kidnap Donkey Kong's friends, planning to power up their Blast-O-Matic weapon and destroy the island. After a tutorial, the player embarks as Donkey Kong to rescue the others from their kidnappers and stop K. Rool's plan. While exploring the in-game world and completing puzzle minigames, the player collects two types of bananas: colored bananas, which are color-coded differently for each Kong character, award the player with banana medals and can be traded for access to each world's boss fight; and golden bananas, a certain number of which are required to unlock each new in-game world. Of 3,831 total collectible items, 1,810 (1,680 colored bananas, 100 golden bananas, 8 boss keys, 1 blueprint, 15 banana medals, 4 K. Rool crowns, the Nintendo coin, and the Rare coin) are required to complete the game.

Most of the puzzles are simple and involve rearranging items, manipulating switches and tiles, or matching items as in the game Concentration. Minigames include races, minecart rides, and barrels that shoot the characters as projectiles. There are five such golden banana-rewarding objectives for each of five playable characters across seven themed worlds200 goals in total, in addition to a connecting overworld. The worlds' themes include underwater, forest, jungle, and industry. Unlike prior Donkey Kong games, the objectives can be completed in any order. The player can fast travel between sections of the level with designated warp pads and can swap between characters in designated swap barrels. The player collects banana coins, which can be spent to unlock new weapons and abilities, and other collectibles such as weapon ammunition and blueprint puzzle pieces. As in other Rare games, the player often encounters an impasse such as an indestructible object or out-of-reach area, and must acquire a new ability with which to eventually backtrack and resolve it.

Donkey Kong's kidnapped friends become playable characters after being rescued. Each of the five characters begin with basic abilities and can purchase additional, unique abilities from Cranky Kong as the game progresses, which are necessary to solve certain puzzles. For example, Donkey Kong can operate levers, Chunky Kong can lift rocks, Tiny Kong can crawl through holes, Diddy Kong can fly, and Lanky Kong can float. The characters each use unique projectiles and musical instruments. For example, some doors can be opened only with Donkey Kong's coconut projectiles and others can be opened only with Diddy Kong's guitar. There are more special abilities than face buttons on the controller, so button combinations are needed to trigger some abilities. Combinations also trigger special modes, including alternative camera angles, a sniper mode, and a snapshot mode which unlocks more in-game secrets. Playable versions of the original Donkey Kong (1981) and Jetpac (1983) are hidden within the game, and playing through them is required to finish the story. The player-character can also transform into animals, such as Rambi the Rhino and Enguarde the Swordfish, who recur from earlier series games. Optional hardware support includes a widescreen mode and Rumble Pak compatibility.

A separate multiplayer mode has six minigames for two to four players. Monkey Smash is an open arena, deathmatch-style minigame in which up to four players find ammo and use their respective projectile weapons from the single-player game to damage other players before losing all their own lives. Battle Arena is a king-of-the-hill minigame in which players use weapons and explosives to knock each other off the edge of a platform. Each mode has several sub-types in which players can compete based on time or score.

Development 
Following its success with the Donkey Kong Country games in the mid-1990s, developer Rare built its next Donkey Kong game on its predecessors' gameplay but not as a direct sequel. Rare's Gregg Mayles led the effort to create Donkey Kong 64. Development began in 1997—shortly after the completion of Donkey Kong Country 3: Dixie Kong's Double Trouble! (1996)— intended for release on the Nintendo 64's 64DD floppy disk drive add-on. It was transitioned to cartridge after the 64DD was delayed and eventually canceled. A team of 16 people worked on the game across three years, and an additional eight members assisted in its later stages. Many developers transitioned from Rare's Banjo team, which had worked on Banjo-Kazooie (1998) and Banjo-Tooie (2000). Donkey Kong 64 was built atop the Banjo game engine.

Rare conceived and originally designed Donkey Kong 64 as a traditional, linear platform game similar to the Donkey Kong Country games. The Nintendo 64 was still new, and at the time Rare did not have a common game engine. The linear version was developed for around 18 months, and was eliminated in favor of what would be the released product.

Lead artist Mark Stevenson described animating and modeling the characters for Donkey Kong 64 as starting from nothing. In the Donkey Kong Country series, the characters and environments had been pre-rendered and modeled with NURB surfaces using PowerAnimator, but Donkey Kong 64s, real-time 3D graphics can only use polygons. Thus, the team used a new tool, Gamegen. However, the pre-rendered models were used as reference for the polygon models and textures, such as for the interior of the Kongs' mouths.

Though real-time graphics prevented Rare from reproducing the detailed pre-rendered graphics of the Donkey Kong Country series, they allowed the company to make characters more expressive. Producing satisfactory character models proved to be a challenge; lead artist Mark Stevenson noted that "[b]eing able to see this character from any angle, you'd make an animation, put it in the game, and you'd think it looked good side-on, but awful from every other angle!" Stevenson also noted that because 3D video gaming was in its infancy, the Donkey Kong 64 models were always going to look worse than the pre-rendered Donkey Kong Country ones.

The strong emphasis on collectibles was a design choice made at the request of Rare co-founder Tim Stamper to distinguish Donkey Kong 64 from Banjo-Kazooie. According to director George Andreas, "I'd always go back to him and say 'Here's some' and he'd go 'No, more things'". Retrospectively, Andreas commented that he should have reined himself in, because he would have liked to unify the color-coded banana system, among other things. Rare also attempted to differentiate Donkey Kong 64 from Banjo-Kazooie through its variety of playable characters, cinematic set-pieces, and bombastic boss battles. According to Andreas, Donkey Kong creator Shigeru Miyamoto was appalled when he saw Donkey Kong shoot a realistic shotgun used as a placeholder during a prerelease demonstration, and quickly sketched the coconut gun used in the final game. A removed feature, "Stop 'N' Swop", would have allowed data to be transferred from Banjo-Kazooie to Donkey Kong 64 to unlock in-game bonuses.

Donkey Kong 64 is the first of two games to require the Nintendo 64's Expansion Pak, a console RAM upgrade bundled with the game. The Expansion Pak was used in previous games to power optional higher-resolution graphics, but in the case of Donkey Kong 64, it was marketed as improving the frame rate and rendering of objects at a distance. According to a 2013 Nintendo Life interview with programmer Chris Marlow, Rare could not resolve a bug that occurred without the Expansion Pak and thus they were forced, at great expense, to bundle the game with the memory upgrade. However, in a 2019 Nintendo Life interview Stevenson called Marlow's story a "myth" and said that the Expansion Pak was required early in development. Though such a bug did exist toward the end of development, according to Stevenson, the Expansion Pak was not the solution for the problem and it was not introduced for that reason. Stevenson also said that the Expansion Pak was used for the dynamic lighting system. Nintendo stated that the choice to bundle, rather than selling the accessory separately, would avoid consumer confusion.

Grant Kirkhope composed the soundtrack, bringing it closer to the tradition of Banjo-Kazooie than to that of David Wise's Donkey Kong Country soundtracks. However, Kirkhope commented that he tried to retain the darker, atmospheric tone that Wise brought to Donkey Kong Country, and included a remix of Wise's "Jungle Japes". Donkey Kong Country 3 composer Eveline Fischer was originally assigned to Donkey Kong 64; Kirkhope became involved after he was asked for assistance, and he provided Donkey Kong's voice. The "DK Rap", which introduces the Kong character abilities, was conceived and written by George Andreas, scored and recorded by Kirkhope, and performed by Andreas and Chris Sutherland. It was intended to be a lighthearted joke despite being interpreted as a "serious" songwriting attempt. Nintendo of America ran a "DK Rap" contest in which fans record their own version of the rap to win prizes including a trip to its headquarters.

Promotion and release
Rare announced Donkey Kong 64 with a single screenshot on its website and coverage in the January 1999 issue of Nintendo Power. Electronic Gaming Monthly wrote that it was playable by the 1997 Electronic Entertainment Expo, though IGN said that it debuted at the 1999 event. It was also demonstrated at Nintendo's 1999 trade show Spaceworld. Donkey Kong 64 was expected to be a bestseller, as the console's "crowning achievement" in graphics and sound.

Donkey Kong 64s sizable  marketing campaign doubled the typical budget for a major Nintendo release. The campaign included a 60-second commercial played at over 10,000 movie theaters during the holiday season, and additional advertisements via billboards, print, and radio. A promotional "The Beast Is Back" tour brought a truck outfitted with Nintendo games across the United States, and a separate sweepstakes between the series and Dr. Pepper was advertised in supermarkets. Nintendo projected sales of  copies within one year, and later that year increased the number to 4 million copies ( more than for The Legend of Zelda: Ocarina of Time), including  of the translucent green Nintendo 64 bundles. Polled retailers expected Donkey Kong 64 to be the top console game sold during the 1999 holiday season. It had little holiday season competition from Nintendo, as Nintendo had moved releases including Mario Party 2, Perfect Dark, and Pokémon Stadium into the next year.

Rare and Nintendo released Donkey Kong 64 in North America in November 1999, and a worldwide release followed the next month. Nintendo offered a special bundle of the game and console, including a banana yellow-colored game cartridge, its required Expansion Pak, and a transparent green "Jolly Rancher-style" Nintendo 64 console.

In April 2015, Donkey Kong 64 was digitally rereleased as one of the first Nintendo 64 games added to Nintendo's Wii U Virtual Console catalog. This was the game's first rerelease, as it had not appeared on the Wii Virtual Console. Why it was never released on the Wii Virtual Console is unknown, although Nintendo World Report speculated that it may have been related to the fact that it contains both the original arcade Donkey Kong (which was already available on the Virtual Console) and Jetpac (which Nintendo does not hold the rights to) as playable bonuses.

Reception 

Donkey Kong 64 received critical acclaim"universal acclaim", according to video game review aggregator Metacritic. It became the Nintendo 64's top seller during the 1999 holiday season and Nintendo's chief defense against competitor Sega's introduction of its Dreamcast console. As a bestseller, Donkey Kong 64 joined Nintendo's "Player's Choice" game selection, where high sales continued through the next holiday season. By 2004, more than 2.3 million units had been sold in North America. It won the 1999 E3 Game Critics award for Best Platform Game, and several annual awards from Nintendo Power, including best overall game of 1999. It was additionally nominated for "Game of the Year" and "Console Game of the Year" during the 3rd Annual AIAS Interactive Achievement Awards (now known as the D.I.C.E. Awards). GamePro named it an "Editor's Choice". IGN described Donkey Kong 64 as the biggest and most ambitious Nintendo 64 game as of its release, but very similar to Banjo-Kazooie in its platforming and puzzle design. Similarities between the two games was a common refrain. Overall, reviewers were more impressed by its visuals than by its other elements, such as gameplay.

Reviewers criticized the emphasis on collecting items and backtracking"an interactive egg hunt". This had become a trend in Rare's games, and Donkey Kong 64 followed the "predictable formula" of making players collect multiple sets of items and in full for a special ending. Next Generation noted Rare's propensity for backtracking. GameSpot more diplomatically assumed that players who liked collecting items would be titillated by its replay value, and those who did not would be frustrated by its chores. The Cincinnati Enquirer applauded the minigames as a "welcome diversion [which] add to the fun of an already massive adventure", and which are so good they would have worked as their own released games on previous-generation consoles. EGM said the puzzles and minigames are fun the first time through, but they quickly become worn when replayed with increasingly tighter time restrictions. GameSpot, however, considered parts of Donkey Kong 64s gameplay "cerebral", requiring the consideration of several simultaneous tasks to solve later puzzles. Already familiar with concepts borrowed from Super Mario 64, Ocarina of Time, and Banjo-Kazooie, critics considered the player's tasks less innovative or interesting to decipher. In retrospective reviews, Nintendo Life described the chore of collecting objects "excessive" and repetitive. They suggested that backtracking, for instance, could be reduced by letting the player switch between characters at any time.

The size and length were frequently noted. With an estimated 30 hours in basic gameplay, IGN called it Rare's War and Peace. GameFan wrote that "big" is an understatement, and "the adventure found within is mastodonic". Writers from AllGame and EGM became frequently lost or distracted in its world. The ingenuity of the boss battles, particularly the final battle against K. Rool, was highlighted, although the story's ending disappointed EGM. Reviewers found little entertainment in the multiplayer mode but praised the gameplay variety between the five characters. The controls also frustrated reviewers, between slow movement speed and camera angle issues. For example, characters who become unresponsive during their attack animations are vulnerable to encroaching enemies. Edge wrote that the lack of camera improvements over Banjo-Kazooie was inexcusable.

Even with the RAM expansion for graphics, Donkey Kong 64s visuals were only found marginallyif at allbetter than that of its contemporary games, such as the previous year's Banjo-Kazooie. IGN avowed that Donkey Kong 64 was not as pretty as Banjo-Kazooie, especially in its water and backgrounds, though it still ranked among the console's prettiest games because the setting is barren and nondescript at first, and only later introduces lighting effects and richer textures. IGN hoped for more from Rare, praising the particle effects (such as in the desert wind), but considering its dynamic lighting overused. N64 Magazine said the enhanced effects were most often used for decoration, though they also played some role in puzzles based on illuminating paths. Graphical difficulties were reported even with the extra memory, such as frame rate slowdowns and distant features not appearing in any detail, though overall they commended the graphical flourishes. GameSpot also saw a lack of variety in the environment.

The characters were praised for their personalities, animations, and portrayal of Rare's signature humor. Several reviewers noted the personalities shown in character animations. IGN considered the characters less baffling than those of other Rare games, and sometimes funny. GameFan found that the addition of the three new playable characters to the series offered little personality that would be missed.

IGN said that the music was less clever than Banjo-Kazooies, but Kirkhope's soundtrack still delivered a variety of moods and fit the setting. Aural clues in the surround sound and the quality of the underwater effects impressed GameSpot. Reviewers criticized the opening "DK Rap" as "embarrassing" and among the worst video game music. GamePro said it was humorous but lowbrow. Eight years later, Nintendo Life said the song was "loved by some, loathed by others", similar to the game itself.

The consensus was that Donkey Kong 64 lacked the revolutionary potential of Donkey Kong Country but was of a sufficient high quality to sell well during the holiday season. The Cincinnati Enquirer described its platform style as coupled with many others, such as Super Mario 64, Banjo-Kazooie, and Jet Force Gemini (1999): "Replace the story line, the graphics and a couple of gameplay elements and you basically have the same game". Nonetheless, he said "its mastering of elements that have been done to death may be just the spark needed" to evolve the genre in games released in later years, celebrating its gameplay as addictive and some of the best on the Nintendo 64. Though hyped fans would be disappointed, IGN said that Donkey Kong 64 remains an excellent and expansive platformer with an overwhelming amount of things to do. GameFan, on the other hand, was most disappointed by how it "truly offers nothing new" and compared its monotony and repetition with the film Eyes Wide Shut: "a big bloated project with not enough brilliant moments to justify the numbness... [of] sitting through the whole thing", it "fails to live up to the Rare name". Donkey Kong 64s 3D platforming was commonplace by the time of its release and, according to GameSpot, would have fared better as a Nintendo 64 launch game. With its competition considered, Daily Radar wrote that Donkey Kong 64 was simply the best 3D platform game on the console. Edge qualified this thought: Donkey Kong 64 was the closest any third-party developer had come to outdoing Nintendo's mastery of game structure and was "a fine effort... in its own right", but its gameplay was derivative and unimaginative compared to the freedom and flexibility of Nintendo's Super Mario 64.

In a retrospective review, Nintendo Life found the Wii U controller an easy substitute for the Nintendo 64's controls.

Legacy 
Rare's 3D platformers became notorious for their emphasis on collecting items, and Kotaku remembered Donkey Kong 64 as "the worst offender" with hundreds of color-coded bananas. Other retrospective reviewers agreed. Electronic Gaming Monthly wrote: "As... Super Mario 64 breathed life into the 3D platforming genre, Donkey Kong 64 sucked it all out" and solidified Rare's reputation for making "collect-a-thon" games. The indie developer behind A Hat in Time, a spiritual successor to Banjo-Kazooie, blamed Donkey Kong 64 for the "collect-a-thon platform adventurer" genre's decline in popularity.

Retro Gamer and Game Informer both remembered the reception as "mixed", in consideration of its similarities with Banjo-Kazooie and lack of genre-pushing changes. Though decently reviewed, this and Rare's subsequent Nintendo 64 releases did not meet the extolment of the company's preceding games, and lackluster sales led to a staff exodus that culminated with the company's acquisition by Microsoft in 2002. Donkey Kong 64 was resultingly Rare's final Donkey Kong game; the series did not receive another major installment until Donkey Kong Jungle Beat (2004) five years later. Electronic Gaming Monthly noted at the game's launch, that the Nintendo 64 was approaching the end of its lifecycle, as gamers turned their sights to the Sega Dreamcast and Sony PlayStation 2. IGN later named Donkey Kong 64 as worthy of a remake for the Nintendo 3DS handheld console. In 2009, Official Nintendo Magazine placed the game 89th in a list of the best Nintendo games, calling it "a forgotten classic".

The "DK Rap" is still remembered for its negative reception, but an upswing in popularity happened more than a decade after release as an Internet meme. Sutherland believes this happened because those who played the game as children had realized the song was meant to be taken as a joke, not a serious songwriting attempt. Similarly, Kirkhope commented that "it's a bit like ABBA, the way they've kind of come back into fashion over the years". Renditions of the "DK Rap" appeared in Super Smash Bros. Melee (2001) and Donkey Konga (2003). In 2017, Kirkhope composed a similar rap for Yooka-Laylee, a platform game made in homage to Rare's works.

Notes

References

External links 
Donkey Kong 64 at the Super Mario Wiki

1999 video games
3D platform games
Cancelled 64DD games
Donkey Kong platform games
Multiplayer and single-player video games
Nintendo 64 games
Rare (company) games
Video game sequels
Video games scored by Grant Kirkhope
Video games featuring female protagonists
Video games set on fictional islands
Video games about size change
Virtual Console games
Virtual Console games for Wii U
Video games developed in the United Kingdom